Forqan Group (named after Sura Al-Furqan) was an Iranian opposition militant group with clandestine cell system adhering to a Shia anti-clerical Islamist ideology.

Forqan assassinated some senior officials, including Gen. Valiollah Qarani, Morteza Motahari, Mohammad Mofatteh and Mohammad Ali Qazi Tabatabaei but it was soon eliminated following the arrest and execution of its key members in 1980. The group also attempted to assassinate future Supreme Leader Khamenei in 1981. 

The group opposed other social sectors such as the "wealthy bazaaris", the "liberal
politicians" and the "Marxist atheists" who, in their view, "were plotting to betray the Islamic Revolution".
The group self-proclaimed to be followers of Ali Shariati, however, according to Ronen Cohen, the claim was used instrumentally to look more "prestigious" and allow them to develop their combined ideology.

Etymology
The Dictionary of Modern Written Arabic describes "forqan" as a meaning criterion or standard. Uri Rubin introduced Forquan as one of the names of the Quran. The root of this word means "separate". In the Tarikh al-Tabari and Tafsir al-Kabir (al-Razi) the root of this word means "God's separating or distinguishing between truth and falsehood, defined as f-r-q".

History
The Forqan group was an Islamic Shia group that promoted a view of Islam that opposes the existence of religious clergy.

According to the Shariati' thought, the rule of the unity of Allah forms the basic element of an equal and just society in the tradition of the Prophet Muhammad prophet. He believed that the Twelve Imams (not Rashidun except Ali) are the real successors of the Prophet and they tried to make an equal society. He considered Shia Islam above all ideologies and religions, but believed clerics should not have key political positions. Akbar Goodarzi was affected by the revolutionary thought of Shariati and authored an interpretation of the Quran named "monotheistic ideology." Shariati believed in Islam without clerics, similar to Abul A'la Maududi 's ideas but Goodarzi was more fanatical than Shariati and in 1970 the Forqan group was founded by Goodarzi. Another person who had important effect on forming the ideology of the Forqan group was Habibollah Ashory, a disgruntled cleric.

The climax of the Forqan group's activities came in the early days after the 1979 Iranian revolution. By early 1980, the group was effectively eliminated due to a series of arrests.

Activities
The Forqan group was a radical Iranian organization that claimed responsibility for a number of assassinations during the 1979 Revolution. The responsibilities of following assassinated persons had been undertaken by this group: Mohammad-Vali Gharani, Morteza Motahhari, Akbar Hashemi Rafsanjani, Mohammad Taghi Haji Tarkhani, Abbas Amir-Entezam, Seyed Razi Shirazi, Seyed Mohsen Behbahani, Hosein Mahdian, Mahdi Iraqi, Hesam Iraqi, Mohammad Baqir Dashtianeh, Hans Joachim Leib, Mohammad Ali Qazi Tabatabaei, Mohammad Mofatteh, Javad Bahmani, Asghar Nemati, Faqih Imani and Qasim Rouhani.

The assassination attempts on prominent Iranians Ahmad Ladjevardi, Ali Khamenei and Abdul-Karim Mousavi Ardebili were attributed to the Forqan group.

See also
Attempted assassination of Ali Khamenei

Note

References

Anti-clerical parties
Islamic terrorism
Militant opposition to the Islamic Republic of Iran
Organisations designated as terrorist by Iran
Organisations of the Iranian Revolution
Terrorism in Iran